Events in the year 2011 in Slovenia.

Incumbents
President: Danilo Türk
Prime Minister: Borut Pahor

Arts and entertainment
In music: Slovenia in the Eurovision Song Contest 2011.

Sports
Football (soccer) competitions: Slovenian PrvaLiga, Slovenian Second League, Slovenian Third League, Slovenian Cup.

References

 
Slovenia
Years of the 21st century in Slovenia